Argenteuil is a provincial electoral district in the Laurentides region of Quebec, Canada that elects members to the National Assembly of Quebec.  It notably includes the municipalities of Saint-Colomban, Lachute and Brownsburg-Chatham.

It was created for the 1867 election, and an electoral district of that name existed even earlier: see Argenteuil (Province of Canada).
 
The territory of the Argenteuil electoral district in the 2011 electoral map is unchanged from its territory in the 2001 electoral map. From 1992 to 2001, the riding also included the municipalities of Mirabel and Huberdeau.

Members of the Legislative Assembly / National Assembly

Geography
It consists of the municipalities of:
Arundel
Barkmere
Brownsburg-Chatham
Gore
Grenville
Grenville-sur-la-Rouge
Harrington
Lac-des-Seize-Îles
Lachute
Mille-Isles
Montcalm
Morin-Heights
Saint-Adolphe-d'Howard
Saint-André-d'Argenteuil
Saint-Colomban
Wentworth
Wentworth-Nord

Linguistic demographics
Francophone: 84.6%
Anglophone: 13.3%
Allophone: 2.2%

Electoral results

* Result compared to Action démocratique

References

External links
Information
 Elections Quebec

Election results
 Election results (National Assembly)
 Election results (QuébecPolitique)

Maps
 2011 map (PDF)
 2001 map (Flash)
2001–2011 changes (Flash)
1992–2001 changes (Flash)
 Electoral map of Laurentides region
 Quebec electoral map, 2011

Quebec provincial electoral districts
Lachute